Spy Ship is a 1942 American Warner Bros. B picture drama film directed by B. Reeves Eason and written by Robert E. Kent. The film, a remake of Fog Over Frisco that was based on the short story The Five Fragments by George Dyer stars Craig Stevens, Irene Manning (playing a character based on Laura Ingalls), Maris Wrixon, Tod Andrews, Peter Whitney and John Maxwell. The film was released by Warner Bros. on June 6, 1942.

Plot

Cast 
Craig Stevens as Ward Prescott
Irene Manning as Pam Mitchell
Maris Wrixon as Sue Mitchell
Tod Andrews as Gordon Morrel 
Peter Whitney as Zinner
John Maxwell as Ernie Haskell
William Forrest as Martin Oster
Roland Drew as Nils Thorson
George Meeker as Paul
George Irving as Harry Mitchell
Frank Ferguson as Burns
Olaf Hytten as Drake
Jack Mower as Inspector Bond
Keye Luke as Koshimo Haru

References

External links 
 

1942 films
Warner Bros. films
American drama films
1942 drama films
Films directed by B. Reeves Eason
World War II films made in wartime
Films scored by William Lava
Films based on short fiction
American black-and-white films
1940s English-language films